Margarita Go-Singco Holmes, popularly known as Dr. Margie Holmes, is a popular psychologist specializing in sex therapy in the Philippines.

Education
Holmes graduated with a degree in Bachelor of Arts in psychology from the University of the Philippines Diliman in 1973. She was one of only seven people to graduate magna cum laude among more than two thousand who graduated that year. Holmes was adjudged "Most Outstanding Graduate" for 1973 by the University of the Philippines Alumni Association.

Holmes was awarded a scholarship grant from the East West Center to study at the University of Hawaii at Manoa, where she received a Master of Public Health, major in International Family Planning, with special studies in Sex Therapy and Marriage Counselling.

Holmes capped her credentials with a Doctor of Philosophy in Clinical Psychology from Ateneo de Manila University.

Holmes was elected into membership of international honor societies of Phi Kappa Phi and Pi Gamma Mu.

Career

Academic
Holmes has been a professor at the University of North Carolina at Charlotte, University of the Philippines, International School, San Carlos Seminary,  Ateneo de Manila University and De La Salle University. She also served as a consultant in government and non-government organizations, notably the Population Center Foundation and the Department of Health.
In addition to being a frequent lecturer and resource speaker to academic, corporate and socio-civic groups in the Philippines and overseas, she is also currently a professorial lecturer at the Graduate School of Psychology at the Pamantasan ng Lungsod ng Maynila.

Television hosting
Holmes created the first-ever Philippine-based show to deal with psychological issues, entitled No Nonsense with Dr. Holmes. She also hosted a segment, Magtanong Kay Dra. Holmes (Ask Dr. Holmes) which was broadcast twice weekly in Teysi ng Tahanan, a daytime talk-show primarily hosted by veteran comedian and impersonator Tessie Tomas.

Holmes is negotiating a cable show that will be broadcast in the Philippines, Hong Kong, Singapore, Guam, Saipan, Honolulu and California.

Writer
Holmes is a regular columnist at Abante, a popular tabloid, Business Mirror and Opinyon, all in Metro Manila. She has published 21 books to date. As a pioneer, she has written the first books in the Philippines to tackle controversial issues on sex and relationships, homosexuality and clinical depression.  Along with her husband, Jeremy Baer, she has co-authored two books: “Love Triangles” and “Imported Love”. They have a weekly column entitled “Two-Pronged” in www.rappler.com, aside from her own column, “Walang Bolahan” for the tabloid, Abante.  Her books and columns have been reviewed in international periodicals, such as Newsweek, Time, the Far Eastern Economic Review, Associated Press, Agence France Press, Asiaweek, Asia Magazine and the Philadelphia Inquirer.

Selected works
Passion, Power, Pleasure. Manila: Anvil Publications, 1991
Magtanong Kay Dra Holmes. Manila: Anvil Publications, 1992
Sexy Saucy Spicy. Manila: Anvil Publications, 1993
Roles We Play in Family Life. Manila: Anvil Publications, 1993
Magtanong Kay Dra. Holmes II. Manila: Anvil Publications, 1993
A Different Love: Being Gay in the Philippines. Manila: Anvil Publications, 1994
Buhay Babae. Manila: Anvil Publications, 1995
Buhay Lalake. Manila: Anvil Publications, 1995
Naiibang Pagibig: Ang Maging Bakla sa Pilipinas. Manila: Anvil Publications, 1996
Buhay May Asawa. Manila: Anvil Publications, 1997
Buhay Single. Manila: Anvil Publications, 1997
Wild Wicked Wonderful. Manila: Anvil Publications, 2000
Bad Bold Brazen. Manila: Anvil Publications, 2000
Life Love Lust: Straightforward Answers to Provocative Questions. Manila: Anvil Publications, 2001
Lalakeng Barako. Manila: Anvil Publications, 2001
Babaeng Palaban. Manila: Anvil Publications, 2001
Down to 1: Depression Stories. Manila: Anvil Publications, 2010

References

External links
Margie Holmes official biography
East West Center at the University of Hawaii in Manoa
University of the Philippines Diliman
Ateneo de Manila University

Year of birth missing (living people)
Living people
Ateneo de Manila University alumni
Academic staff of Ateneo de Manila University
University of the Philippines Diliman alumni
University of Hawaiʻi at Mānoa alumni
Filipino relationships and sexuality writers
Sex educators
Filipino educators
Filipino psychologists
Filipino journalists
Filipino television personalities
Filipino writers
Filipino columnists
Filipino women columnists
Filipino sex columnists
Filipino women journalists
Filipino women psychologists
20th-century Filipino writers
20th-century Filipino women writers
21st-century Filipino writers
21st-century Filipino women writers